Hour Peak is a  mountain summit located in British Columbia, Canada.

Description
Hour Peak is set within Garibaldi Provincial Park and is part of the Garibaldi Ranges of the Coast Mountains. Precipitation runoff and glacial meltwater from the south side of the peak drains to the Pitt River, whereas the northern slope drains to Cheakamus Lake via Isosceles Creek. Topographic relief is significant as the summit rises 1,630 meters (5,348 feet) above Pitt River in 3 kilometers (1.9 miles). The mountain's toponym was officially adopted on June 21, 1978, by the Geographical Names Board of Canada.

Climate

Based on the Köppen climate classification, Hour Peak is located in the marine west coast climate zone of western North America. Most weather fronts originate in the Pacific Ocean, and travel east toward the Coast Mountains where they are forced upward by the range (orographic lift), causing them to drop their moisture in the form of rain or snowfall. As a result, the Coast Mountains experience high precipitation, especially during the winter months in the form of snowfall. Winter temperatures can drop below −20 °C with wind chill factors below −30 °C. This climate supports the Isosceles Glacier on the north slope and unnamed glaciers surrounding the peak.

See also
 
 Geography of British Columbia

References

External links
 Hour Peak: Weather forecast

Garibaldi Ranges
Two-thousanders of British Columbia
Sea-to-Sky Corridor
New Westminster Land District
Coast Mountains